Stephen Louis Mauotekena Mailagi is a Wallisian athlete who has represented Wallis and Futuna at the Pacific Games.

At the 2017 Oceania Athletics Championships he won silver in the junior shot put.

At the 2018 French Athletics Championships he won silver in the shot put.

At the 2019 Pacific Games in Apia he won gold in the discus throw.

At the 2021 French Espoirs Championships he won silver in the shot put.

At the 2022 French Athletics Championships he won bronze in the shot put.

References

Living people
2001 births
Wallis and Futuna discus throwers
Wallis and Futuna shot putters